The 1981 Central Fidelity Banks International was a women's singles tennis tournament played on indoor carpet courts at the Robins Center in Richmond, Virginia in the United States. The event was part of the Category 3 tier of the Toyota Series that was part of the 1981 WTA Tour. It was the third edition of the tournament and was held from August 10 through August 16, 1981. Seventh-seeded Mary-Lou Piatek won the singles title and earned $18,000 first-prize money.

Finals

Singles
 Mary-Lou Piatek defeated  Sue Barker 6–4, 6–1
 It was Piatek's first singles title of her career.

Doubles
 Sue Barker /  Ann Kiyomura defeated  Kathy Jordan /  Anne Smith 4–6, 7–6, 6–4

Prize money

Notes

References

External links
 International Tennis Federation (ITF) tournament edition details 

Central Fidelity Banks International
Central Fidelity Banks International
Central Fidelity Banks International
Central Fidelity Banks International
Central Fidelity Banks International